Kraig Chiles (born May 14, 1984) is an American soccer player currently playing for the San Diego Sockers in the Major Arena Soccer League.

Career

Youth and college
Chiles played high school soccer for Poway High School in Poway, California, and remains one of the school's all-time leading goalscorers. At San Diego State University he was named to the All-Pac-10 team three times, including First Team All-Pac-10 senior year. Kraig scored 21 goals and had 12 assists in his four years with the Aztecs.

Professional
Chiles was drafted 9th overall by CD Chivas USA in the 2008 MLS Supplemental Draft. He made his MLS debut for Chivas against FC Dallas on 20 April 2008, but was released by the team in February 2009.

Having been unable to secure a professional contract elsewhere, Chiles signed for Los Angeles Legends of the USL Premier Development League in June 2009. He scored on his debut for the Legends on June 19, 2009, in a 5-0 win over Ogden Outlaws.

In 2010 Chiles was signed by the San Diego Sockers. Chiles led the Professional Arena Soccer League's Western Conference with 33 goals, helping the Sockers capture the PASL North American National Championship. Kraig was re-signed for the 2011–12 and 2012–13 seasons. Chiles earned the League MVP honor from the PASL in 2011, 2012, 2013, scoring over 200 goals in his 5-year professional indoor soccer career.

Chiles has also been included in the United States Futsal National team for the last 4 years, earning 14 caps scoring 9 goals.

 2010, 2011, 2012 and 2013 Professional Arena Soccer League (PASL) National Champions
 2010, 2011 and 2012 US Open Cup National Champion 
 2010 Second Team All-PASL Pro
 2011 PASL Player of the Year
 2011 First Team All-PASL Pro
 2011 PASL Playoff MVP
 2011 PASL Golden Boot scoring 33 goals in 14 games
 2012 PASL Player of the Year
 2012 First Team All-PASL Pro
 2012 PASL Golden Boot breaking the single season scoring record with 46 goals in 15 games
 2013 PASL Player of the Year
 2013 First Team All-PASL Pro
 2013 Golden Boot winner breaking a single season record with 56 goals in 16 games
 2013 PASL Playoff MVP
 2014 First Team All-PASL Pro
 2022 MASL Playoff MVP
 2011-13 US Futsal National Team participating in Futsal Grand Prix in Brazil, Tour of Guatemala, Concacaf World Cup qualifiers in Guatemala, Four Nations Championship in England.

References

External links
 San Diego State profile

1984 births
Living people
American soccer players
Chivas USA players
LA Laguna FC players
Major League Soccer players
San Diego Sockers (PASL) players
San Diego State Aztecs men's soccer players
USL League Two players
Chivas USA draft picks
Association football midfielders
Major Arena Soccer League players
San Diego Sockers players
American men's futsal players
Soccer players from San Diego
People from Poway, California